Warmington may refer to:
Places
 Warmington, Northamptonshire, England
 Warmington, Warwickshire, England
location of Warmington Priory
People
 Brian Herbert Warmington (1924–2013), British historian
 Cinde Warmington, American politician
 Everald Warmington (born 1952), Jamaican politician
 E. H. Warmington (1898–1987), noted Latin translator
 Sir Marshall Warmington, 1st Baronet (1842–1908), English barrister and politician
 Peter Warmington (born 1934), English soccer player 
 S. J. Warmington (1884-1941), British actor in the early 20th century
 William Warmington (c.1556–1627 or later), English Roman Catholic priest
 Michael Warmington (born 1971)

Title of Gentry
 Warmington baronets

See also
 Walmington-on-Sea, fictional setting of sitcom Dad's Army